263 Squadron may refer to:

No. 263 Squadron RAF
VMM-263, United States Marine Corps